Frane Milčinski (pen name Ježek; 14 December 1914 – 27 February 1988) was a Slovene poet, satirist, humorist and comedian, actor, children's writer, and director. He is considered one of Slovenia's foremost 20th-century satirists and entertainers.

Life
Milčinski was born in Ljubljana in 1914 as the third child of the writer and judge Fran Milčinski. During World War II he was interned at the Gonars concentration camp. He was married to the writer and journalist Jana Milčinski.

Work
He worked in the theatre and radio from an early age.

Awards
Throughout his career, Milčinski won numerous awards. The 1951 film Kekec, for which he co-wrote the screenplay and theme song "Dobra volja je najbolja," won the first international award for a Slovene feature film when it won a Golden Lion in the children's film category at the Venice Film Festival in 1952.

Milčinski also won the Levstik Award in 1959 for his story Zvezdica Zaspanka (The Sleepy Little Star). In 1975 he won the Grand Prešeren Award for lifetime achievement in radio, television, film, and literature.

Legacy
The Ježek Award for creative achievement in radio and television is named after him; it has been bestowed annually since 1989 by Slovenia's national public broadcasting organization, Radiotelevizija Slovenija.

Selected prose
 13 in ena: humoreske Franeta Milčinskega – Ježka (13 and One: Humorous Stories by Frane Milčinski, a.k.a. Ježek, 1951) 
 Zvezdica Zaspanka (The Sleepy Little Star, 1959) 
 Legenda o birokratu (A Legend about a Bureaucrat, 1961)   
 Desetnica in druge pravljice (The Tenth Daughter and Other Tales, 1964)  
 Govoreči bankovec: antologija slovenske humoristične proze (The Talking Banknote: An Anthology of Slovene Humorous Prose, 1976) 
 Preprosta ljubezen (Simple Love, 1987)  
 Ta svet je pesmi vreden (This World Is Worthy of a Song, 1988) 
 Humoreske (Humorous Stories, 1998) 
 13 + 8 humoresk (13 + 8 Humorous Stories, 2003)

Screenplays
 Kekec (1951)
 Svet na Kajžarju (1952)
 Vesna (1953)
 The Beginning Was Sin (1954)
 Ne čakaj na maj (1957)
 Dobri stari pianino (1959)
 Zvezdica Zaspanka (1965)

References

Slovenian children's writers
Slovenian poets
Slovenian male poets
Slovenian comedians
Slovenian male film actors
Slovenian radio personalities
1914 births
1988 deaths
Prešeren Award laureates
Levstik Award laureates
Writers from Ljubljana
20th-century Slovenian male actors
20th-century poets
20th-century comedians